Rosewood is an unincorporated community in Putnam County, in the U.S. state of Missouri.

History
Rosewood had its start as a post office serving a rural area.  A post office called Rosewood was established in 1897, and remained in operation until 1908.

References

Unincorporated communities in Putnam County, Missouri
Unincorporated communities in Missouri